John Paul Holtz (born August 28, 1993) is an American football tight end who is a free agent. He played college football at Pittsburgh. He was signed by the Cleveland Browns as an undrafted free agent in 2016 and previously played for the Washington Redskins and Chicago Bears.

Professional career

Cleveland Browns 

Holtz was signed by the Cleveland Browns as an undrafted free agent on May 5, 2016. He was waived by the Browns on September 3, 2016. On December 20, 2016, he was signed to the Browns' practice squad. The Browns signed Holtz to a reserve/future contract on January 2, 2017.

On September 2, 2017, Holtz was waived by the Browns and was signed to the practice squad the next day. He was released on October 10, 2017.

Washington Redskins
Holtz signed with the Washington Redskins on August 11, 2018. On September 1, 2018, he was waived for final roster cuts before the start of the 2018 season, and signed with the team's practice squad four days later. He was promoted to the active roster on December 29, 2018.

Holtz was waived on August 31, 2019, but was signed to the practice squad the following day. He was promoted to the active roster on September 7, 2019. In his NFL debut against the Philadelphia Eagles, he played exclusively on special teams. He was waived on September 10, 2019.

Chicago Bears
On September 11, 2019, Holtz was claimed off waivers by the Chicago Bears. During the 2019 season, in addition to playing tight end, he spent time at fullback when the Bears ran rushing plays out of the I formation. In a Week 14 win over the Dallas Cowboys, Holtz led the Bears in receiving yards as he caught three passes for 56 yards; during the second quarter, he caught a screen pass and gained 30 yards to set up a field goal. He ended the year with seven starts in 14 games as he caught seven passes for 91 yards.

Holtz became an exclusive-rights free agent after the 2019 season. He re-signed with the Bears on April 17, 2020. Due to the 2020 coronavirus pandemic, the NFL canceled all preseason activities, and depth charts had to be ordered with no performance information on players. Holtz made the 53-man roster as the fourth tight end in the depth, below Jimmy Graham, Cole Kmet, and Demetrius Harris. Holtz mainly served as an up-man for the kick returner (Cordarrelle Patterson). This led to his first 2020 kick return in Week 9, a 17-24 loss to the Tennessee Titans. He returned it for seven yards. Holtz played in the next three games, all losses, to the Minnesota Vikings, the Green Bay Packers, Detroit Lions, during which he returned three kicks. On his second kick in the Week 13 30-34 loss to the Lions, Holtz walked off the field with an apparent shoulder injury.

Holtz signed a contract extension with the team on March 3, 2021.

New Orleans Saints
On April 5, 2022, Holtz signed with the New Orleans Saints. He was waived on August 30, 2022 and signed to the practice squad the next day. He was elevated to the active roster on October 1, 2022, via a standard elevation which caused him to revert back to the practice squad after the game. He was signed to the active roster on October 5. He was released on November 19 and re-signed to the practice squad.

NFL career statistics

References

External links
Pittsburgh Panthers bio

1993 births
Living people
American football tight ends
Cleveland Browns players
Pittsburgh Panthers football players
Players of American football from Pittsburgh
Washington Redskins players
Chicago Bears players
New Orleans Saints players